Honeywell Studio, also known as the Wabash Country Club, is a historic clubhouse located at Wabash, Wabash County, Indiana. It was built in 1936, and is a Tudor Revival style masonry building. It consists of a five-story central tower with a -story east wing and one-story west wing. An addition was constructed in 1946 and the terrace enclosed in 1967. It was originally built as the private movie studio of Mark Honeywell (1874–1964) and leased to the Wabash Country Club in 1945.

It was listed on the National Register of Historic Places in 2005.

References

Clubhouses on the National Register of Historic Places in Indiana
Tudor Revival architecture in Indiana
Buildings and structures completed in 1936
Buildings and structures in Wabash County, Indiana
National Register of Historic Places in Wabash County, Indiana
Wabash, Indiana